Cinta 7 Susun is an Indonesian soap opera musical comedy drama produced by SinemArt that aired daily on RCTI at 18:00pm (Indonesia West Time). This is an autobiography that tells of the journey formation personnel 7icons because of where they lived in the Flats which will soon be evicted, through their stories in the form of a fictitious (because it is not based on actual events). Cast is 7icons, Mischa Chandrawinata, Baim Wong, Raya Kohandi, Devi Noviaty, Gege Elisa, Shandy Ishabella, Gunawan Sudradjat, Cut Memey, Rico Tampatty, Minati Atmanegara, Mario Maulana as well as other supporting cast as well as some cameo actors who have often appeared on Indonesian movie or television series.

Synopsis 
Cinta 7 Susun tells the story of the girls in the Flats "RT 7" they are A.Tee, Pj, Linzy, Natly, Mezty and Grace with different nature, origin and background. They all live in the same place, in the Flats RT 7. Unfortunately, their way is not easy. They must deal with their biggest rivals, "The Barbies" which is Linzy favorites girl band, consists of a rich girl like Britney gang (Raya Kohandi), Milley (Devi Noviaty), Selena (Gege Elisha) and Demi (Shandy Ishabella). Competition for increasingly tapered A.Tee had trouble with Britney. Britney do not like the act of A.Tee and Flats RT 7, and after learning that Danish (Mischa Chandrawinata), the former coach "The Barbies" and former girlfriend who also defended and lived in the Flats RT 7, Britney urged both parents to evict Flats RT 7 adjacent to their Luxury Housing.
                                             
Then uniquely A.Tee met Joe (Baim Wong) whose brother of Britney that was being forced to be marry by his parents, Joe and A.Tee then make a fake girlfriend to play with the help of her best friend (A.Tee, Pj, Linzy, Natly, Mezty and Grace) who also assisted by Mezty's father, Hj.Makmun (Gunawan Sudradjat) and Natly's mother, Fatimeh (Cut Memey). On the other hand, Demi member of "The Barbies" are secretly love Danish. After the play unfolds, problems started coming threatening Flats RT 7. So A.Tee, Pj, Linzy, Natly, Mezty and Grace was united, quite difficult to unite them with a different character. Britney also take advantage of the situation to ask the Danish train "The Barbies" back. But for the love of the residents of Flats RT 7 in which they live, and the people in it who are like family, ultimately Danish, Joe, A.Tee, Pj, Linzy, Natly, Mezty and Grace struggled reduce personal ego and conflict between them. With Danish upbringing as a coach and Joe as their manager, then A.Tee, Pj, Linzy, Natly, Mezty and Grace finalize their musical skills and vocal girlband to win the Competition. They all finally united by their love of music, which formed "Rusun" girlband by accident in an attempt to save their homes from demolition.

But the problem was re-emerging in the Flats RT 7, when Pj father (Henky Solaiman) brings a man named Choky (Giovanni Jehoshaphat Tobing) who wants to propose to her, and PJ turned to love Danish. A.Tee also began to realize she loved Joe, while Joe was close to his best friend Mezty and also Selena "The Barbies" personnel who dare to approach Joe. There is also competition between Mezty's father, Hj.Makmun, and Rojali (who helped Joe and A.Tee pretense before) to treat Natly's mom, Fatimeh, as wives.

When Danish and "Rusun" girlband to make his debut, Danish needs 7 voices. Choky save girlband "flats" with his sister named Uty, but with a condition that he can be with Pj. Uty was ever oppressed by Britney, when she was fat. With a vision and a mission, finally girlband "flat" areas formed the band metamorphosed into a female vocal group with 7 different characters which they call "7icons".

How is the continuation of the story 7 girls in the Flats RT 7 struggle to save their homes? Will they success to fight their own egos and unite for their debut in music recording?

Cast

Flats RT 7 Residents

Luxury Housing Residents

Supporting Cast

Songs

Theme
Various musician
 7icons
Label: Keci Music

Album:The Journey of LoveTrack1. Playboy (Created by: Dewiq/DJ Sumantri)2. Penjaga Hati (Created by: Abdul [Coffe Theory] & Riza)3. Nempel Di Hati{My Friends} (Ciptaan: Angel Icons)4. Patah Hati (Ciptaan: Kiki [Bean])5. Tahan Cinta (Created by: Raymond)6. Sabar Sayang (Created by: Arlan)7. Jealous (Created by: Adrian Warouw)

Single:1. Bebi Romeo Mega Hits: Cinta Cuma Satu (Created by: Bebi Romeo & Re-arrangement: J-Flow)2. Playboy{Bali Mix} (Created by: Dewiq/DJ Sumantri & Re-arrangement: Keci Music & 7icons)

Digital Single:1.  Cinta 7 Susun (Created by: Anda Wardhana & Deni Indrajaya)2. PHP{Pemberi Harapan Palsu} (Created by: Anda Wardhana)<br/ >3. TTP{Tiba Tiba Posesif} (Created by: Anda Wardhana)

Devi NoviatyLabel: 18 Musik

Single:1. Luar Biasa2. In Love With You (Created by: Catur S)

The BarbiesBy: SinemArt

Single:1. Lossaah (Created by: Anda Wardhana)2.  Veni Vidi Vici (Created by: Anda Wardhana)

Opening and closing
 7iconsSong title: "Cinta 7 Susun"Created by: Anda Wardhana & Deni Indrajaya

International broadcasts

References

External links
 Cinta 7 Susun at Website SinemArt
 Sinopsis Cinta 7 Susun at Website channel RCTI rcti.tv
 Cinta 7 Susun at Website Indonesian Film Censorship lsf.go.id

2013 Indonesian television series debuts
2013 Indonesian television series endings
RCTI original programming
Indonesian comedy television series
Indonesian drama television series
Indonesian television soap operas
Musical television soap operas
2010s Indonesian television series
2010s television soap operas